Lithocarpus hystrix is a tree in the beech family Fagaceae. The specific epithet hystrix is from the Greek meaning "spiny", referring to the cupule.

Description
The brownish or reddish bark is scaly or lenticellate and contains tannin.

Distribution and habitat
Lithocarpus hystrix grows naturally in Peninsular Malaysia, Singapore, Sumatra and Borneo.

References

hystrix
Trees of Malaya
Trees of Sumatra
Trees of Borneo
Plants described in 1844